The Potts River is a river of the Canterbury region of New Zealand's South Island. It flows generally south from the southern end of the Arrowsmith Range through a steep-sided valley between the Potts Range to the west and the Big Hill Range to the east.

See also
List of rivers of New Zealand

References

Rivers of Canterbury, New Zealand
Rivers of New Zealand